Parliamentary elections were held in Bulgaria on 22 April 1923. The result was a victory for the Bulgarian Agrarian National Union, which won 212 of the 245 seats. Voter turnout was 86%.

Results

References

Bulgaria
Parliamentary 1
1923 04
Bulgarian
1923 elections in Bulgaria